Mount Chider is a notable mountain,  high, standing  southeast of Mount Hart in the Admiralty Mountains, Victoria Land. It was mapped by the United States Geological Survey from surveys and from U.S. Navy air photos, 1960–64, and named by the Advisory Committee on Antarctic Names for Lieutenant Commander Thomas J. Chider, helicopter pilot with U.S. Navy Squadron VX-6 at McMurdo Station in Operation Deep Freeze 1968.

References 

Mountains of Victoria Land
Borchgrevink Coast